Malichus I or Malchos I (Nabataean Aramaic:  Malīḵū or 
 Malīḵūʾ) was a king of Nabataea who reigned from 59 to 30 BC.

Malichus was a possible cousin of Herod the Great of the Herodian kingdom. When Herod fled Judea in 40 BC to escape imprisonment by the Hasmonean ruler Antigonus II Mattathias, who had already imprisoned his brother Phasael, he first traveled to the court of Malichus. However, Malichus I turned Herod away, as the Nabataean king was politically aligned with the Parthian Empire, which viewed Herod as a client ruler of the rival Roman Republic. Herod then decided to take refuge instead in Alexandria, at the court of Cleopatra VII of Ptolemaic Egypt. 

Malichus I eventually came into conflict with Cleopatra VII after her lover and Roman triumvir Mark Antony granted her Nabataean territories in the Gulf of Aqaba along the Red Sea, which had long been used as a staging ground for Nabataean raids on Ptolemaic lands. After a bitter open conflict between Malichus I and Cleopatra, allegedly stoked by her aggressive acts, Malichus I, along with Herod, failed to show up and support Antony and Cleopatra during the fateful Battle of Actium in 31 BC, a decisive victory for their rival Octavian.

See also
List of rulers of Nabatea
Malichus II

Notes

References

1st-century BC Nabataean monarchs
1st-century BC Arabs
Roman client rulers
30 BC deaths